Forbes & Company Limited, the erstwhile Forbes Gokak Limited, is an Indian engineering, shipping and logistics company based in Mumbai. It was established by John Forbes of Aberdeenshire, Scotland in 1767 in India. Over years, the management of the company moved from the Forbes family to the Campbells, to the Tata Group, and finally to the Shapoorji Pallonji Group. It is one of the oldest companies of India and has been listed on the Bombay Stock Exchange since 1919.

Forbes & Company Limited is involved in three subsidiary companies:

 Forbes Engineering: Robotics, industrial automation, precision cutting tools and springs
 Forbes Real Estate
 Forbes Technosys: ATM and banking kiosks

References

External links
 

Shapoorji Pallonji Group
Engineering companies of India
Logistics companies of India
Shipping companies of India
Companies based in Mumbai
Companies established in 1767
1767 establishments in India
1767 establishments in the British Empire
Indian companies established in 1919
Companies listed on the Bombay Stock Exchange